Tenbridge is a vertical-lift railroad bridge over the Tennessee River in Chattanooga, Tennessee.

The original span was a swing span with a center pivot that was originally built in ca. 1879/1880.  It was replaced by a vertical lift span in 1917, but the lift towers and machinery were not installed until 1920. It remains a very busy crossing on the Cincinnati, New Orleans and Texas Pacific Railway, a major subsidiary of the Norfolk Southern Railway.  The bridge carries two mainline tracks across the river.

The bridge is one of only three known nesting locations in Tennessee for peregrine falcons, a Tennessee endangered species.

Sources

Railroad bridges in Tennessee
Bridges completed in 1920
Vertical lift bridges in the United States
Norfolk Southern Railway bridges
Southern Railway (U.S.)
Bridges in Chattanooga, Tennessee
Bridges over the Tennessee River
Towers in Tennessee